Renato Riggio (born April 14, 1978 in Salta, Argentina) is an Argentine footballer.

Teams
  Gimansia y Tiro de Salta 1997-2000
  Unión Española 2001-2002
  Juventud Antoniana 2002-2003
  Instituto de Córdoba 2003-2004
  Independiente 2004-2005
  Olimpo de Bahía Blanca 2005
  San Martín de San Juan 2006
  Central Norte 2007
  Instituto de Córdoba 2007
  Jorge Wilstermann 2008
  Gimansia y Tiro de Salta 2009-2010
  Alumni de Villa María 2011–XXXX

References
 
 

1978 births
Living people
Argentine footballers
Argentine expatriate footballers
Club Atlético Independiente footballers
Gimnasia y Tiro footballers
San Martín de San Juan footballers
Juventud Antoniana footballers
Instituto footballers
Olimpo footballers
Unión Española footballers
C.D. Jorge Wilstermann players
Chilean Primera División players
Argentine Primera División players
Expatriate footballers in Chile
Expatriate footballers in Bolivia
Association football midfielders
People from Salta
Sportspeople from Salta Province